Yevhen Tarasenko (born 3 March 1983 in Cherkasy, Ukraine) is a professional Ukrainian football defender who currently plays for the Ukrainian Premier League club Chornomorets Odesa. He moved from Karpaty Lviv on 19 February 2011, having signed a contract for 1.5 years.

References

External links
Website Karpaty Profile
Profile on EUFO
Profile on Football Squads

1983 births
Living people
Sportspeople from Cherkasy
Ukrainian footballers
FC Dnipro Cherkasy players
FC Karpaty Lviv players
FC Chornomorets Odesa players
FC Cherkashchyna players
Ukrainian football managers
FC Dnipro Cherkasy managers
Association football defenders